Roskilde Håndbold  is a handball club from Roskilde, Denmark. Currently, Roskilde Håndbold competes in the women's Danish 1st Division. The home arena of the club is Roskilde Hallerne.

History

Team

Current squad 
Squad for the 2022–23 season 

Goalkeepers
 1  Maria Faurhøj
 12  Emilie Jacobsen
 20  Ida Thrane
Wingers
LW
 10  Mathilde Kagan
 11  Ida Handrek
 31  Mathilde Dalbo Kirkegaard
RW
 25  Sarah Grundtvig
 36  Julie Gottschalksen
Line players
 13  Amalie Tolderlund
 17  Mollie Edelved 
 23  Christine Søndergaard

Back players
LB
 6  Caroline Kliver
 7  Viola Tranberg
 19  Silje Selstad
 48  Matilde Heisel White
 52  Emma Karsbæk Eggertsen
CB
 5  Emilie Theil
 15  Mathilde Dige
 27  Alberte Halmø
RB
 4  Viktoria Kagan 
 21  Sarah Vabø-Rasmussen

Transfers
Transfers for the 2022-23 season

Joining
  Emma Karsbæk Eggertsen (LB) (from  Ajax København)
  Emilie Theil (PM) (from  Ajax København)

Leaving

Former players 
  Althea Reinhardt 
  Mette Gravholt
  Kristina Kristiansen
  Mia Rej

External links

 Official website

Danish handball clubs
Roskilde Municipality